The Provincial Court of Nova Scotia is the court of criminal jurisdiction for the Canadian province of Nova Scotia. There are twenty-three Justices and one Chief Justice on the bench, who sit in one of 33 locations over the province.

The Justices are appointed by the province.

Judges

Current Judges

Supernumerary Judges

Previous Judges

References

External links
 Provincial court

Nova Scotia courts
Nova_Scotia